Dominic Su Haw Chiu (born 29 May 1939) is a Malaysian prelate of the Catholic Church. He served as the first bishop of the Diocese of Sibu from 1987 to 2011.

Biography 
Su entered and studied at St Francis Xavier's Minor Seminary, Singapore, in 1961 to 1963. In 1964, he studied philosophy and theology at College General, Penang until 1969. He studied there together with his fellow seminarian Antony Selvanayagam, emeritus bishop of Penang.

Su ordained a deacon on 28 April 1969. He was ordained to the priesthood on 4 December 1969 by the late bishop Charles Reiterer. Su then furthered his studies at Rome, to pursue Canon Law, attending the Pontifical Urbaniana University from 1979 to 1981.

In 1986, Pope John Paul II appointed and consecrated Su on 6 January 1987 at St. Peter's Basilica in Rome, Italy. On 11 February 1987, Su was installed as the Bishop of the new Diocese of Sibu by Archbishop Renato Martino (now Cardinal), Apostolic Delegate to Malaysia. In 2009, Su celebrates a thanksgiving mass for his 40th anniversary of priestly ordination and 70th birthday. In 2011, he resign for early retirement, and was succeeded by the auxiliary Bishop Joseph Hii Teck Kwong. He has served as the president of the Malaysia-Singapore-Brunei Episcopal Commission for Pastoral Health Care.

References

External links 

Catholic-Hierarchy.org

1939 births
Living people
Malaysian people of Chinese descent
People from Sarawak
20th-century Roman Catholic bishops in Malaysia
21st-century Roman Catholic bishops in Malaysia
Bishops appointed by Pope John Paul II